Verticordia densiflora var. densiflora is a flowering plant in the myrtle family, Myrtaceae and is endemic to the south-west of Western Australia. It is a shrub with small leaves and pink or, occasionally white flowers. It is one of 5 varieties of the species Verticordia densiflora.

Description

The sepals are pale pink, to very dark purplish pink and fade with age, or sometimes white. Flowering occurs from September to February.

Taxonomy and naming
Verticordia densiflora was first formally described by John Lindley in 1839 and the description was published in A Sketch of the Vegetation of the Swan River Colony. In 1991, Alex George undertook a review of the genus Verticordia and described five varieties of Verticordia densiflora including this variety.

Distribution and habitat
This variety of V. densiflora grows in sand, often associated with granite in heath, shrubland or woodland and is widespread from Geraldton in the north to Bremer Bay and Busselton in the south and eastwards towards the Wongan Hills. It occurs in the Avon Wheatbelt, Esperance Plains, Geraldton Sandplains, Jarrah Forest, Mallee and Swan Coastal Plain biogeographic regions.

Conservation
Verticordia densiflora var. densiflora is classified as "not threatened" by the Western Australian Government Department of Parks and Wildlife.

Use in horticulture
This variety is well established in gardens where it often produces honey-perfumed flowers from November to March. It has grown well in both summer- and winter-rainfall areas in a wide range of soils, producing more flowers when grown in full sun but deeper colours in part shade. It has been successfully propagated from seed, from cuttings and by grafting onto Darwinia citriodora rootstock.

References

densiflora var. densiflora
Rosids of Western Australia
Eudicots of Western Australia
Plants described in 1839